is an Apollo asteroid and a near-Earth object that has a 1 in 4 billion chance of impacting Earth on 7 March 2113. It is estimated to be 5 meters in diameter, which means that it poses no threat if it impacts Earth. An impact would have the kinetic energy of about 3 kt of TNT, and would probably result in an air burst in the upper atmosphere. It is the least threatening asteroid listed on the Sentry Risk Table. The very short observation arc of only 3 hours results in a very poorly constrained orbit, and it could just as easily be 2 AU from Earth on 7 March 2113.

See also
List of Apollo asteroids

References

External links 
 List of Apollo asteroids, Minor Planet Center
 
 
 

Minor planet object articles (unnumbered)
20120317
20120317